The Société d'Émulation de Montbéliard is a société d'émulation in the former principality of Montbéliard. It was founded in 1851, with the aim of encouraging and propagating a taste for letters, sciences and the arts.

External links
Official homepage

Learned societies of France
1851 establishments in France